The Deep South is a region of the United States.

Deep South may also refer to:

Deep South (film), 1937 short film
"The Deep South" (Futurama), an episode of the TV show Futurama
Deep South (book), by Paul Theroux
Deep South (Josh Turner album)
Deep South (Bill Leverty album)
Deep South Wrestling, professional wrestling promotion
The southern South Island of New Zealand, especially the Southland and Otago Regions

See also